A student wing is a subsidiary, autonomous, or independently allied front of a larger organization that is formed in order to rally support from students and focus on student specific issues, typically of those attending college or university. Student wings may also be discussion forums for student members and supporters of the organization to debate policy and ideology.

Distinctions

From youth wings
Student wings are distinct from youth wings, as the former is not necessarily established on a young-general basis.

From political factions
Student wings are not normally considered as factions of a political party, as student wings are usually intended as student focused extensions of party policy and ideology rather than being differently ideologised from the leadership of the party proper.

See also
 Women's wing
 Youth wing

Political terminology
Student organizations
Student wings of political parties